The Havel–Oder–Wasserstraße (HOW) is a navigable waterway connecting Berlin (Havel and Spree) and the German-Polish border at the West Oder River at Friedrichsthal north of Schwedt. Approximately 135 km long, it is composed of the following sections:
 Havel-, Scheital-, Oderhaltung and the Hohensaaten-Friedrichsthaler Wasserstraße (HFW), which are connected by the Lehnitz lock, 
 the ship's lift Niederfinow and 
 the West Schleuse Hohensaaten.

The route between the Havel and Lehnitz lock and the peak position are together called Oder-Havel-Kanal for the Oderhaltung (Wriezener Alte Oder) section of the river, also known as the Oderberger Gewässer. The German-Polish border forms part of the west or north Mescherin (enlargement of the total length by about 14 km) and the Berlin-Spandau shipping canal, the Berlin Westhafen on a short route with the Havelhaltung (by Spandau lock above the Spreemündung).

The HOW is a class IV federal waterway with restrictions.

References

Canals in Germany
Canals in Brandenburg
Federal waterways in Germany
Waterways in Germany
Oder basin
Havel basin